Abigail May Alcott Nieriker (July 26, 1840 – December 29, 1879) was an American artist and the youngest sister of Louisa May Alcott. She was the basis for the character Amy (an anagram of May) in her sister's semi-autobiographical novel Little Women (1868). She was named after her mother, Abigail May, and first called Abba, then Abby, and finally May, which she asked to be called in November 1863 when in her twenties.

Early life 

Abigail May Alcott was born July 26, 1840, in Concord, Massachusetts, the youngest of the four daughters born to Amos Bronson Alcott and Abigail May Alcott.

Her sister was the novelist Louisa May Alcott, who supported her studies in Europe and with whom she had a fond relationship, although Louisa May was at times jealous of her family life as well as her ability to get what she wanted and needed.

Artistic from an early age, she was the inspiration for Amy, one of the sisters in Louisa May Alcott's Little Women, who was described as follows: "She was never so happy as when copying flowers, designing fairies, or illustrating stories with queer specimens of art."

Public education 
She studied teaching at the Bowdoin School, a Boston public school beginning in January, 1853. Taking over for Louisa in 1861, May taught at the first Kindergarten founded by Elizabeth Palmer Peabody for a month before returning to her own work. Beginning in December, 1860, May was in Syracuse, New York, where she taught an early form of art therapy at Dr. Wilbur's asylum (Syracuse State School). then returned home in August, 1861 or 1862 to begin teaching art at the Concord school run by her father's friend Franklin Benjamin Sanborn.

Art

19th-century women artists 
As educational opportunities expanded in the 19th century, women artists became part of professional enterprises, including founding their own art associations. Artwork created by women was considered to be inferior, and to help overcome that stereotype women became "increasingly vocal and confident" in promoting women's work, and thus became part of the emerging image of the educated, modern and freer "New Woman". Artists then, "played crucial roles in representing the New Woman, both by drawing images of the icon and exemplifying this emerging type through their own lives."

Education 
Beginning in 1859, Alcott studied art at the School of the Museum of Fine Arts in Boston. May Alcott visited Paris, studied at the Académie Julian in 1870 and exhibited in both cities, as well as elsewhere in the US and in London. She painted mainly flowers, but also made excellent copies of works by J.M.W. Turner. She studied art anatomy with William Rimmer in Boston, and also studied with William Morris Hunt, Krug, Vautier and Müller among others. She taught art to young Daniel Chester French.

She studied in Paris, London and Rome during three European trips in 1870, 1873 and 1877, which were made possible by the publication in 1868 of her sister Louisa's book Little Women. She traveled on at least one of the trips with Alice Bartlett and her sister Louisa May, where she "came into her own as an artist." She studied sculpture, sketching and painting. In Europe she found that women had greater educational opportunities than in the United States, but the art academies did not allow women to paint live nude models. For that, she studied under Krug, who managed to enable both male and female students to paint live models.

Alcott had illustrated the first edition of Little Women, to a negative critical reception. The early illustrations were made before her trips to and studies in Europe.

Career 
After studying in Paris, she subsequently divided her time between Boston, London and Paris. Her strength was as a copyist and as a painter of still life, either in oils or watercolors. Her success as a copyist of Turner was such as to command the praise of Mr. John Ruskin, and secure the adoption of some of her work for the pupils to copy at the South Kensington schools in London.

She published Concord Sketches with a preface by her sister Louisa May (Boston, 1869). After having studied in Europe, she had become "an accomplished artist" by the 1870s, and her works during that time showed marked improvement compared to the earlier illustrations for Little Women and the "quirky" depiction of Walden Pond in Concord Sketches. Her works after her European studies and exposure to great works of art reflected "a surer hand, a clearer focus, and a broader vision as the world".

She created the plan and outfitted a studio in 1875 for a Concord art center to support and promote emerging artists.

In 1877, her still life was the only painting by an American woman to be exhibited in the Paris Salon, selected over the work of Mary Cassatt. She made portraits and paintings of exterior scenes, some with an oriental flair. John Ruskin praised her copies of J.M.W. Turner, having called her "the foremost copyist of Turner of her time." Her strength was as a copyist and as a painter of still life, in oils and watercolors, and she painted many panels featuring flowers on a black background. A panel of goldenrod given to neighbor/mentor Ralph Waldo Emerson still hangs in his study. Several can also be seen at the Orchard House in Concord.

She was living in London and studying landscape art when she met Ernest Nieriker. The couple married on March 22, 1878, in London. The marriage was said by authors Eiselein and Phillips to have occurred despite her family's reluctance. In contrast, Louisa Alcott called the day a "happy event" and described Ernest as a handsome, cultivated and successful "tender friend". Further, "May is old enough to choose for herself, and seems so happy in the new relation that we have nothing to say against it." May was 38 years old, and Ernest Nieriker a 22-year-old Swiss tobacco merchant and violinist. Ernest was supportive of May's artist career and had helped her through the death of her mother on November 25, 1877, and they were engaged in February 1878. The couple honeymooned in Le Havre and then lived in Meudon, a Parisian suburb, where she primarily lived after her marriage.

The following year, she made the painting La Négresse, which was exhibited at the Paris Salon, "what might be judged her masterpiece" of her career. It is a realistic painting of a black woman that portrays her unique individuality without being romantic or erotic.

In her letters to family members, May expressed her happiness of married life as an artist in Paris.

In her book Studying Art Abroad, and How to do it Cheaply (Boston 1879) she advised:"There is no art world like Paris, no painters like the French, and no incentive to good work equal to that found in a Paris atelier."

Childbirth and death 
On November 8, 1879, in Paris, May gave birth to a daughter, Louisa May "Lulu." Seven weeks later on December 29, 1879, May died, possibly of childbed fever. By her wish, and because Ernest traveled often for work, May's sister Louisa May brought up Lulu until her death in 1888. Then, Lulu was raised by her father, Ernest Nieriker, in Zurich, Switzerland.

Though Louisa placed a stone with her initials at the family plot at Sleepy Hollow Cemetery, May is buried in Paris at Montrouge.

In 2002, an exhibition of her work and life, "Lessons, sketching, and her dreams: May Alcott as Artist", was the first major show of her work.

Gallery

Publication 

Reprinted (2015) Fb &C Limited

Notes

References

Further reading
 Julia Dabbs, May Alcott Nieriker: Author and Advocate. Travel Writing and Transformation in the Late Nineteenth Century (Anthem Press, 2022). ISBN 1-78527-864-9
 The Forgotten Alcott: Essays on the Artistic Legacy and Literary Life of May Alcott Nieriker, eds. Azelina Flint and Lauren Hehmeyer (Routledge, 2022) ISBN 978-0-367-69159-2
 Julia K. Dabbs, "Empowering American Women Artists:  The Travel Writings of May Alcott Nieriker," Nineteenth-Century Art Worldwide (2016)
 Erica E. Hirshler, A Studio of Her Own: Women Artists in Boston 1870-1940 
 The Uncollected Works of Louisa May Alcott 
 Caroline Ticknor, May Alcott: A Memoir (Little, Brown, 1928)
 Selected Letters of Louisa May Alcott

External links

 

Alcott family
American women painters
Botanical illustrators
Painters from Massachusetts
1840 births
1879 deaths
People from Concord, Massachusetts
19th-century American painters
American women illustrators
Académie Julian alumni
Art copyists
19th-century American women artists
American expatriates in France
Quincy family
Sewall family
Deaths in childbirth